Abgarmak (also Romanized as Ābgarmak and Āb Garmak) is a village in Kuri Rural District, in the Central District of Jam County, Bushehr Province, Iran. At the 2006 census, its population was 722, in 149 families. In 2018, the mayor of Jam, Iran, announced a zero waste program in this village.

References 

Populated places in Jam County